Louis Andrew Cuvillier (February 4, 1871 – May 18, 1935) was an American lawyer and politician from New York.

Life
He was born on February 4, 1871, in Fairfax County, Virginia, the son of Samuel Cuvillier (1836–1900) and Jane P. (Taylor) Cuvillier (1842–1880). He attended St. John's Military Academy, in Alexandria, Virginia; and Georgetown University. He married Margaret Sheridan (died 1930), and they had one daughter. He practiced law in New York City.

He served in the U.S. Army during the Spanish–American War; and during World War I.

Cuvillier was a member of the New York State Assembly (New York Co., 30th D.) in 1907, 1908 and 1909. In November 1909, he ran for re-election but was defeated by Republican Peter Donovan. Cuvillier  1911, 1912 and 1913; and was Chairman of the Committee on Military Affairs in 1911 and 1913.

He was again a member of the State Assembly (New York Co., 20th D.) in 1920, and was one of the fiercest supporters of the expulsion of the five Socialist assemblymen. In November of that year, he ran for re-election but was defeated by his Republican opponent Mario G. DiPirro.

Cuvillier was again a member of the State Assembly in 1922, 1923, 1924, 1925, 1926, 1927, 1928, 1929, 1930, 1931, 1932 and 1933. In November 1933, he ran for re-election but was defeated by Republican Wilbur J. Murphy.

Cuvillier was the Democratic minority candidate for Clerk of the New York State Assembly in January 1934, and returned as a member to the Assembly in 1935.

He died on May 18, 1935, at the home of his sister at 1,120 Bryant Avenue in the Bronx, of bronchial pneumonia; and was buried at Arlington National Cemetery.

Louis Cuvillier Park, located at the Manhattan approach to the Triborough Bridge, was named in his honor.

Sources

External links
 
 Louis Cuvillier Park at NYC Parks

1871 births
1935 deaths
Politicians from the Bronx
Democratic Party members of the New York State Assembly
Georgetown University alumni
Deaths from pneumonia in New York City
Burials at Arlington National Cemetery
United States Army officers